Artex is a surface coating used for interior decorating.

Artex may also refer to:
Artex Ltd., English manufacturer of building materials
Artex Art Fair, New Zealand (1986–1994)
Artex S.A., Cuban company which produces and distributes artistic works
"Artex" (song), single the British musical collective A Band, 1993

See also
Artexte